Alakin (also Romanized as Ālākīn) is a village in Charuymaq-e Jonubesharqi Rural District, Shadian District, Charuymaq County, East Azerbaijan Province, Iran. At the 2006 census, its population was 140, in 24 families.

References 

Populated places in Charuymaq County